Marsden Hartley (January 4, 1877 – September 2, 1943) was an American Modernist painter, poet, and essayist. Hartley developed his painting abilities by observing Cubist artists in Paris and Berlin.

Early life and education

Hartley was born in Lewiston, Maine, where his English parents had settled. He was the youngest of nine children. His mother died when he was eight, and his father remarried four years later to Martha Marsden. His birth name was Edmund Hartley; he later assumed Marsden as his first name when he was in his early twenties. A few years after his mother's death when Hartley was 14, his sisters moved to Ohio, leaving him behind in Maine with his father where he worked in a shoe factory for a year. These bleak occurrences led Hartley to recall his New England childhood as a time of painful loneliness, so much so that in a letter to Alfred Stieglitz, he once described the New England accent as "a sad recollection [that] rushed into my very flesh like sharpened knives".

After he joined his family in Cleveland, Ohio, in 1892, Hartley began his art training at the Cleveland School of Art, where he held a scholarship.

In 1898, at the age of 22, Hartley moved to New York City to study painting at the New York School of Art under William Merritt Chase, and then attended the National Academy of Design. Hartley was a great admirer of Albert Pinkham Ryder and visited his studio in Greenwich Village as often as possible. His friendship with Ryder, in addition to the writings of Walt Whitman and American transcendentalists Henry David Thoreau and Ralph Waldo Emerson, inspired Hartley to view art as a spiritual quest.

Maturation and New York exhibitions
From 1900 to 1910, Hartley spent his summers in Lewiston and the region of Western Maine near the village of Lovell. He considered the paintings he produced there—of Kezar Lake, the hillsides, and mountains—his first mature works. These paintings so impressed New York photographer and art promoter Alfred Stieglitz that he agreed on the spot to give Hartley his first solo exhibition at Stieglitz's art gallery 291 in 1909. Hartley continued to exhibit his work at 291 and Stieglitz's other galleries until 1937. Stieglitz also provided Hartley's introduction to European modernist painters, of whom Cézanne, Picasso, Kandinsky, and Matisse would prove the most influential upon him.

Hartley in Europe

Hartley traveled to Europe for the first time in April 1912, and he became acquainted with Gertrude Stein's circle of avant-garde writers and artists in Paris.  Stein, along with Hart Crane and Sherwood Anderson, encouraged Hartley to write as well as paint.

In a letter to Alfred Stieglitz, Hartley explains his disenchantment of living abroad in Paris. A single year has passed since he began living overseas. "Like every other human being I have longings which through tricks of circumstances have been left unsatisfied... and the pain grows stronger instead of less and it leaves one nothing but the role of spectator in life watching life go by-having no part of it but that of spectator." Hartley wanted to live within the noiseless countryside and an invigorating city.

German sympathies 
In April 1913 Hartley relocated to Berlin, the capital of the German Empire where he continued to paint, and became friends with the painters Wassily Kandinsky and Franz Marc. He also collected Bavarian folk art. His work during this period was a combination of abstraction and German Expressionism, fueled by his personal brand of mysticism. Many of Hartley's Berlin paintings were further inspired by the German military pageantry then on display, though his view of this subject changed after the outbreak of World War I, once war was no longer "a romantic but a real reality".

Two of Hartley's Cézanne-inspired still life paintings and six charcoal drawings were selected to be included in the landmark 1913 Armory Show in New York.

In Berlin, Hartley developed a close relationship with a Prussian lieutenant, Karl von Freyburg, who was the cousin of Hartley's friend Arnold Ronnebeck. References to Freyburg were a recurring motif in Hartley's work, most notably in Portrait of a German Officer (1914). Freyburg's subsequent death during the war hit Hartley hard, and he afterward idealized their relationship. Many scholars interpreted his work regarding Freyburg as embodying homosexual feelings for him. Hartley lived in Berlin until December 1915.

Hartley returned to the U.S. from Berlin as a German sympathizer following World War I. Hartley created paintings with much German iconography. The homoerotic tones were overlooked as critics focused on the German point of view. According to Arthur Lubow, Hartley was disingenuous in arguing that there was "no hidden symbolism whatsoever".

Later years, return to the U.S., and "the painter of Maine"
Hartley finally returned to the U.S. in early 1916. Following World War I he was obligated to return to the United States. Upon his return Hartley painted Handsome Drinks. The drinkware calls back to the gatherings hosted by Gertrude Stein, where Hartley met Pablo Picasso, and Robert Delaunay. From 1916 to 1921 Hartley lived and worked in Provincetown, Bermuda, New York, and New Mexico.  

After raising money through an auction of over 100 of his paintings and pastels at the Anderson Gallery, New York in 1921, Hartley returned to Europe again where he remained through the 1920s, with occasional visits back to America. While following in the footsteps of Paul Cézanne, he created still lifes and landscapes in the drawing medium of silverpoint. In 1930 he spent the summer and fall painting mountains in New Hampshire, and in 1931 at what is known as Dogtown Common, near Gloucester, Massachusetts. Hartley was awarded a Guggenheim Fellowship, which he spent in Mexico from 1932 to 1933, followed by a year in the Bavarian Alps (1933–34). After a few months in Bermuda (1935), he traveled north by ship where he discovered a small fishing village in Blue Rocks, Nova Scotia and lived for two summers with the Francis Mason family of fishermen. In September 1936 the two Mason brothers drowned in a hurricane—an event deeply affected Hartley and would later inspire an important series of portrait paintings and seascapes. He finally returned to Maine in 1937, after declaring that he wanted to become "the painter of Maine" and depict American life at a local level. For the remainder of his life, he worked in such Maine locations as Georgetown, Vinalhaven, Brookville, Corea, and Mt. Katahdin until his death in Ellsworth in 1943. His ashes were scattered on the Androscoggin River.

Hartley was not overt about his homosexuality, often redirecting attention towards other aspects of his work. Works such as Portrait of a German Officer and Handsome Drinks are coded. The compositions honor lovers, friends, and inspirational sources. Hartley no longer felt unease at what people thought of his work once he reached his sixties. His figure paintings of athletic, muscular males, often nude or garbed only in briefs or thongs, became more intimate, such as Flaming American (Swim Champ), 1940 or Madawaska--Acadian Light-Heavy--Second Arrangement (both from 1940). As with Hartley's German officer paintings, his late paintings of virile males are now assessed in terms of his affirmation of his homosexuality.

Important works

Portrait of a German Officer (1914) 
In a personal memoir that was not finished, Hartley wrote "I began somehow to have curiosity about art at the time when sex consciousness is fully developed and as I did not incline to concrete escapades. I of course inclined to abstract ones, and the collecting of objects which is a sex expression took the upper hand." Hartley's use of object abstraction became the motif for his paintings that commemorate his "love object", Karl von Freyburg. According to Meryl Doney, Hartley conveyed his emotions regarding his friend's traits in his paintings through everyday items. In this painting the Iron Cross, the Flag of Bavaria and the German flag are attributes to Karl von Freyburg, along with the yellow '24', the age he was when he died.

Selected paintings

Writing
In addition to being considered one of the foremost American painters of the first half of the 20th century, Hartley also wrote poems, essays, and stories and published during his lifetime in many of the little magazines of the day, including one book of essays (Adventures in the Arts: Informal Chapters on Painters, Vaudeville and Poets. New York: Boni, Liveright, 1921; reprinted New York: Hacker Books, 1972) and three volumes of poetry (Twenty-five Poems, published by Robert McAlmon in Paris in 1923; Androscoggin, 1940; and Sea Burial, 1941. Posthumous collections of his writings include: Selected Poems. Edited by Henry W. Wells, New York: Viking Press, 1945; The Collected Poems of Marsden Hartley, 1904-1943. Edited and with an introduction by Gail R. Scott and a foreword by Robert Creeley. Santa Rosa, Calif.: Black Sparrow Press, 1987; On Art. Edited and with an introduction by Gail R. Scott.  New York: Horizon Press, 1982; and his autobiography, Somehow a Past: The Autobiography of Marsden Hartley. Edited, with an introduction by Susan Elizabeth Ryan. Cambridge MA and London: 1995.

Cleophas and His Own: A North Atlantic Tragedy is a story based on two periods he spent in 1935 and 1936 with the Mason family in the Lunenburg County, Nova Scotia, fishing community of East Point Island. Hartley, then in his late 50s, found there both an innocent, unrestrained love and the sense of family he had been seeking since his unhappy childhood in Maine. The impact of this experience lasted until his death in 1943 and helped widen the scope of his mature works, which included numerous portrayals of the Masons. He wrote of the Masons, "Five magnificent chapters out of an amazing, human book, these beautiful human beings, loving, tender, strong, courageous, dutiful, kind, so like the salt of the sea, the grit of the earth, the sheer face of the cliff." In Cleophas and His Own, written in Nova Scotia in the fall of 1936 and re-printed in Marsden Hartley and Nova Scotia, Hartley expresses his immense grief at the tragic drowning of the Mason sons. The independent filmmaker Michael Maglaras made a feature film, Cleophas and His Own, released in 2005, which uses a personal testament by Hartley as its screenplay.

Scholarship 
Since the artist's death in 1943, there have been several research projects to catalogue all of his paintings and drawings.

 An inventory begun by representatives of his Estate and carried out by the American Art Research Council under the auspices of the Whitney Museum of American Art and later enlarged upon by scholar and art critic, Elizabeth McCausland (but never published)
 A catalogue raisonné project of Hartley's work was begun in the mid-1980s by art historian Gail Levin, Distinguished Professor at Baruch College, and The Graduate Center of The City University of New York (as yet unpublished)
 Most recently, in 2020, Bates College Museum of Art in Lewiston, Maine, has partnered with leading Hartley scholar, Gail R. Scott, on The Marsden Hartley Legacy Project: The Complete Paintings and Works on Paper which will be an online, publicly accessible, searchable collection of all known works by the artist.

See also 
 List of Maine Painters
 American Modern
 Transcendentalism
 Cubism
 Homosociality
 Charles Demuth

Notes

References

Cassidy, Donna M., Marsden Hartley: Race, Region, and Nation. Hanover, NH: University Press of New England, 2005.
Coco, Janice, "Dialogues with the Self: New Thoughts on Marsden Hartley's Self-Portraits". Prospects: An Annual of American Cultural Studies, 30 (2005): 623–649.
Ferguson, Gerald, ed., [Essays by Ronald Paulson and Gail R. Scott]. Marsden Hartley and Nova Scotia. Halifax, Nova Scotia: The Press of the Nova Scotia College of Art and Design, 1987. 
Harnsberger, R. Scott, Four Artists of the Stieglitz Circle: A Sourcebook on Arthur Dove, Marsden Hartley, John Marin, and Max Weber [Art Reference Collection, no. 26]. Westport: Greenwood Press, 2002.
Hartley, Marsden, Adventures in the Arts: Informal Chapters on Painters, Vaudeville, and Poets. New York, NY: Boni and Liveright, 1921.
Hartley, Marsden, Selected Poems: Marsden Hartley. Ed. Henry W. Wells. New York, NY: Viking Press, 1945.
Hartley, Marsden, Somehow a Past: The Autobiography of Marsden Hartley. Ed. Susan Elizabeth Ryan. Cambridge: MIT Press, 1997.
Haskell, Barbara, Marsden Hartley. Exhibition Catalogue. Whitney Museum of American Art. New York, NY: New York University Press, 1980.
Hole, Heather, Marsden Hartley and the West: The Search for an American Modernism. New Haven, CT: Yale University Press, 2007.
Kornhauser, Elizabeth Mankin, ed., Marsden Hartley. Exhibition catalogue. New Haven, CT: Yale University Press, 2003.
Ludington, Townsend, Marsden Hartley: The Biography of an American Artist. Ithaca, NY: Cornell University Press, 1992.
 
Scott, Gail R., Marsden Hartley. New York, NY: Abbeville Press, 1988.
Weinberg, Jonathan. Speaking for Vice: Homosexuality in the Art of Charles Demuth, Marsden Hartley, and the First American Avant-Garde. New Haven, CT: Yale University Press, 1993.

External links
 
 
 Marsden Hartley discussed in Conversations from Penn State interview

Writings
 
 
 Scans of Hartley's Adventures in the arts: informal chapters on painters, vaudeville and poets
 The Importance of Being "Dada" from Adventures in the arts.

Museums
 Marsden Hartley Collection, Beinecke Rare Book and Manuscript Library, Yale University.
 Marsden Hartley Memorial Collection and Archives, Bates College Museum of Art.
 The Metropolitan Museum of Art on Marsden Hartley	
 Marsden Hartley – The National Gallery of Art
 Marsden Hartley: American Modern – Memphis Brooks Museum of Art
 Marsden Hartley – New Mexico Museum of Art
 Marsden Hartley - San Antonio Museum of Art.

Biographies and articles
 Marsden Hartley Biography: Hollis Taggart Galleries 
 Marsden Hartley and Nova Scotia 
 Cleophas and His Own a film by Michael Maglaras
 Marsden Hartley, Art and the Personal Life, 1928, by Hartley accessed online Aug. 7, 2007

1877 births
1943 deaths
19th-century American painters
American male painters
20th-century American painters
Abstract painters
American people of English descent
Parsons School of Design alumni
Modern painters
Dada
American gay artists
Art Students League of New York alumni
People from Lewiston, Maine
Artists from Maine
American portrait painters
People from Lovell, Maine
People from Ellsworth, Maine
Federal Art Project artists
Cleveland Institute of Art alumni
Students of William Merritt Chase
American art critics
20th-century American non-fiction writers
19th-century American male artists
20th-century American male artists